Phan Thanh Giang (born 3 October 1981) is a Vietnamese footballer who plays for Cà Mau. He played for Vietnamese international at the 2008 AFF Suzuki Cup.

Honors 
Đồng Tâm Long An:
V-League: 2005, 2006
Vietnamese Cup: 2005
Vietnam:
ASEAN Football Championship: 2008

References 

1981 births
Living people
Vietnamese footballers
Association football defenders
Vietnam international footballers